The 2016 AFC U-16 Championship qualification decided the participating teams of the 2016 AFC U-16 Championship. The tournament is the 17th edition of the AFC U-16 Championship, the biennial international youth football championship organised by the Asian Football Confederation (AFC) for the men's under-16 national teams of Asia.

A total of 16 teams qualified to play in the final tournament, including India who qualified automatically as hosts but also competed in the qualifying stage.

Same as previous editions, the tournament acts as the AFC qualifiers for the FIFA U-17 World Cup. The top four teams of the final tournament will qualify for the 2017 FIFA U-17 World Cup in India as the AFC representatives, besides India who qualified automatically as hosts. If India are among the top four teams, the fifth-placed team (i.e., the losing quarter-finalist with the best record in the tournament) will also qualify for the 2017 FIFA U-17 World Cup.

Draw
The draw for the qualifiers was held on 5 June 2015 at the AFC House in Kuala Lumpur. A total of 45 teams entered the qualifying stage and were drawn into eleven groups.
West Zone, with 24 entrants from Central Asia, South Asia and West Asia, had six groups of four teams.
East Zone, with 21 entrants from ASEAN and East Asia, had one group of five teams and four groups of four teams.

The teams were seeded according to their performance in the previous season in 2014.

Note:
1 Non-FIFA member, ineligible for U-17 World Cup.

Player eligibility
Players born on or after 1 January 2000 were eligible to compete in the 2016 AFC U-16 Championship.

Format
In each group, teams played each other once at a centralised venue. The eleven group winners and the four best runners-up from all groups qualified for the final tournament. If India were one of the group winners or best runners-up, the fifth-best runner-up also qualified for the final tournament.

Tiebreakers
The teams were ranked according to points (3 points for a win, 1 point for a draw, 0 points for a loss). If tied on points, tiebreakers would be applied in the following order:
Greater number of points obtained in the group matches between the teams concerned;
Goal difference resulting from the group matches between the teams concerned;
Greater number of goals scored in the group matches between the teams concerned;
If, after applying criteria 1 to 3, teams still have an equal ranking, criteria 1 to 3 are reapplied exclusively to the matches between the teams in question to determine their final rankings. If this procedure does not lead to a decision, criteria 5 to 9 apply;
Goal difference in all the group matches;
Greater number of goals scored in all the group matches;
Penalty shoot-out if only two teams are involved and they are both on the field of play;
Fewer score calculated according to the number of yellow and red cards received in the group matches (1 point for a single yellow card, 3 points for a red card as a consequence of two yellow cards, 3 points for a direct red card, 4 points for a yellow card followed by a direct red card);
Drawing of lots.

Groups
The matches were played between 2–6 September 2015 for Group H; 12–20 September 2015 for Group G (five-team group); 16–20 September 2015 for all other groups.

Group A
All matches were held in Palestine.
Times listed were UTC+3.

Group B
All matches were held in Kyrgyzstan.
Times listed were UTC+6.

Group C
All matches were held in Qatar.
Times listed were UTC+3.

Group D
All matches were held in Bangladesh.
Times listed were UTC+6.

Group E
All matches were held in Iran.
Times listed were UTC+4:30.

Group F
All matches were held in Kuwait.
Times listed were UTC+3.

Group G
All matches were held in Laos.
Times listed were UTC+7.

Group H
All matches were held in Singapore.
Times listed were UTC+8.

Group I
All matches were held in China.
Times listed were UTC+8.

Group J
All matches were held in Vietnam.
Times listed were UTC+7.

Group K
All matches were held in Mongolia.
Times listed were UTC+9.

Ranking of second-placed teams
The ranking among the runner-up team of all groups are determined as follows:
Greater number of points obtained in the group matches;
Greater goal difference resulting from the group matches;
Greater number of goals scored in group matches;
Greater number of wins in the group matches;
Fewer score calculated according to the number of yellow and red cards received in the group matches (1 point for a single yellow card, 3 points for a red card as a consequence of two yellow cards, 3 points for a direct red card, 4 points for a yellow card followed by a direct red card);
Drawing of lots.

In order to ensure equality when comparing the runner-up team of all groups, the results of the matches against the fourth-placed and fifth-placed teams in the groups having four or five teams are ignored due to Groups D, F and K having only three teams after one of the teams in the group withdrew.

Qualified teams
The following 16 teams qualified for the final tournament.

2 Bold indicates champion for that year. Italic indicates host for that year.

Goalscorers

References

External links
, the-AFC.com

Qualification
AFC U-16 Championship qualification
U-16 Championship qualification